The Return of Jenifa is a 2011 Nigerian comedy drama film. The film was produced by Funke Akindele, who was also a titular character, reprising her role from the prequel, Jenifa (2008). It was directed by Muhydeen Ayinde.

Plot

Cast

Funke Akindele as Jenifa
Eniola Badmus
Naeto C 		
Denrele Edun	
eLDee 
Freeze 
Kaffy
Antar Laniyan	
Omawumi Megbele	
Ronke Ojo	
Sasha P 		
Helen Paul 		
Yinka Quadri	
Rukky Sanda 		
Banky W.
Wizkid
DJ Zeez

References

External links

2011 films
Nigerian comedy-drama films
2011 comedy-drama films